Out of the Loop may refer to:
 Out of the Loop (I Am the World Trade Center album), 2001
 Out of the Loop (Brecker Brothers album), 1994
 Out-of-the-loop performance problem

See also
 The Loop (disambiguation)